"I Owe You Nothing" is a song by British boy band Bros. Written by Nicky Graham and Tom Watkins and produced by Graham, the song was originally released as their debut single in 1987 but failed to chart. In 1988, it was remixed and re-released following the success of their breakthrough single "When Will I Be Famous?". The original version of the song can be found on the band's 1988 debut album, Push.

"I Owe You Nothing" was Bros's sole UK number-one single, spending two weeks at the top in June 1988. The song additionally peaked within the top 10 in Australia, Belgium, Denmark, France, Iceland, Ireland, the Netherlands, South Africa, and Switzerland. In the United States, the song reached number 10 on the Billboard Dance Club Songs chart. The single has sold nearly 300,000 copies in the UK as of June 2013.

Track listings
7-inch single (1987 and 1988)
A. "I Owe You Nothing" – 3:34
B. "I Owe You Nothing" (The Voice) – 3:15

12-inch and cassette single (1987)
 "I Owe You Nothing" (the Shep Pettibone mix)
 "I Owe You Nothing" (Pettibeats)
 "I Owe You Nothing" (The Voice)
 "I Owe You Nothing" (7-inch mix)

12-inch single (1988)
A1. "I Owe You Nothing" (club mix) – 7:36
B1. "I Owe You Nothing" (The Voice) – 3:15
B2. "I Owe You Nothing" (The Beats) – 2:36

12-inch "Over 18 Mix" single (1988)
 "I Owe You Nothing" (Over 18 Mix) – 18:01
 The record is single-sided, with the B-side labelled as "Nothing".

CD single (1988)
 "I Owe You Nothing" – 3:34
 "I Owe You Nothing" (Club Mix) – 7:36
 "I Owe You Nothing" (The Voice) – 3:15
 "I Owe You Nothing" (The Beats) – 2:36

US 7-inch single (1988)
A. "I Owe You Nothing" – 3:34
B. "Shocked" – 4:19

Charts

Weekly charts

Year-end charts

Certifications

References

1987 songs
1987 debut singles
1988 singles
Bros (British band) songs
CBS Records singles
Epic Records singles
Songs written by Nicky Graham
Songs written by Tom Watkins (music manager)
UK Singles Chart number-one singles